Survivor Japan: North Mariana, was the fourth and final season of Survivor Japan and it aired from January 14, 2003 to March 11, 2003. This season was set in Rota, in the Northern Mariana Islands. The original tribes this season were named Somnak (ソムナック, Somunakku) and Manglo (マングル, Manguru), and the merged tribe was named Langet (ランヘット, Ranhetto). The major twist this season took place after the first three contestants had been eliminated. A challenge called 'Shuffle Challenge' was held, and as a result, three members from each tribe were switched to the opposing tribe. Midway through the season, a typhoon hit the island and the remaining contestants were forced to live in a cave for several days. Ultimately, it was Kōshin Gunji who won the season by a jury vote of 5-2 over Atsuko Koizumi.

Finishing order

Voting history

 As Kōshin and Yuka both received five votes at the seventh tribal council, the number of votes each had received at previous tribal councils was taken into account. Kōshin had one previous vote, but Yuka had three therefore Yuka was eliminated.

External links
https://web.archive.org/web/20040610021215/http://www.tbs.co.jp/survivor/4/profile-kamioka.html
http://www.h4.dion.ne.jp/~seiya-mu/survivor/survivor4.ja.episode.html

Japan
Japanese game shows
Television shows filmed in the Northern Mariana Islands